A Scattering of Seeds, also known as A Scattering of Seeds: The Creation of Canada is a Canadian documentary television series.

The series explored the contributions of immigrants to Canada. It was produced by White Pine Pictures. A total of 52 episodes originally aired on the History channel from 1998 to 2001, with repeats on various Canadian Television Networks, such as CBC Television, Société Radio-Canada (in French), TVOntario, Vision TV and The Discovery Channel.

Episodes

External links
 
 A Scattering of Seeds: The Creation of Canada - White Pine Pictures

1998 Canadian television series debuts
2001 Canadian television series endings
1990s Canadian documentary television series
2000s Canadian documentary television series
History (Canadian TV network) original programming
History of immigration to Canada
Television series about immigration in Canada